Kamphaeng Phet is a town (thesaban mueang) in central Thailand, former capital of the Kamphaeng Phet Province. It covers the complete tambon Nai Mueang of the Mueang Kamphaeng Phet district. As of 2020, it has a population of 28,817.

History 
Kamphaeng Phet was an ancient outpost town during the Sukhothai period, as evidenced by the city walls and fortifications that remain today. Before the creation of the city, legends says that there were two cities present in the location; Chakangrao (ชากังราว) and Nakhon Chum (นครชุม). Chakangrao was built on the east bank of the Ping River while Nakhon Chum was built on the west bank of the Ping River.

Kamphaeng Phet received municipality status on March 11, 1936. When the municipality was established, it had an operation area of 4.5 square kilometers. Later in 1966, it expanded to an area of 14.9 square kilometers.

Demographics 
Since 2005, the population of Kamphaeng Phet has been decreasing.

Climate

See also
 Mueang Kamphaeng Phet District
 Kamphaeng Phet Province
 Kamphaeng Phet Historical Park

References

External links

http://www.kppcity.com Website of town (Thai only)

Populated places in Kamphaeng Phet province
Cities and towns in Thailand